Grant Achatz (born April 25, 1974) is an American chef and restaurateur often recognized for his contributions to molecular gastronomy or progressive cuisine. His Chicago restaurant Alinea has won numerous accolades and Achatz himself has won numerous awards from prominent culinary institutions and publications, including the Food and Wine's "best new chefs" award in 1998, "Rising Star Chef of the Year Award" for 1999, "Best Chef in the United States" for 1998 and a 2003 "Who's Who Inductee" from the James Beard Foundation.

Early life and education
Achatz's early culinary career included time spent working in his parents' restaurants in St. Clair, Michigan as a teenager, followed by enrollment in The Culinary Institute of America in Hyde Park, New York. Following graduation in 1994, Achatz landed a position at Charlie Trotter's. After a time, he found a position at Thomas Keller's highly acclaimed restaurant, The French Laundry, in Yountville, California. Achatz spent four years at The French Laundry, rising to the position of sous chef.

Career
In 2001, Achatz moved to the Chicago area to become the Executive Chef at Trio in Evanston, Illinois, which at the time of his arrival had a four-star rating from the Mobil Travel Guide. Over the next three years, with Achatz at the helm, Trio's reputation soared and in 2004 the restaurant was rewarded with a fifth star from Mobil, becoming one of just 13 restaurants so honored at the time.

In 2005, Achatz went out on his own, opening Alinea in Chicago's Lincoln Park neighborhood with Nick Kokonas. The restaurant is located up the block from the famed Steppenwolf Theatre Company and is housed in a modest gray brick building which bears no external markings beyond its street number. Inside, the restaurant has no bar, no lobby and seats just 64 guests. Achatz serves diners a small-course tasting menu, consisting of approximately 18 courses. After less than two years of operation, the Mobil Travel Guide bestowed its Five Star Award on Alinea, making Alinea one of just 16 restaurants nationwide to rate five stars for 2007.

In October 2006, Gourmet magazine named Alinea the best restaurant in America in its feature on "America's Top 50 Restaurants".

In 2007, Restaurant magazine added Alinea to its list of the 50 best restaurants in the world at number 36, the highest new entry of the year. In 2008, that publication moved Alinea up its list 15 spots, to number 21 in the world. In 2009 Alinea moved up to number 10 in the world and advanced to number 7 for 2010, when it was also the highest ranked North American restaurant honored. Alinea maintained its top North American Ranking for 2011, while moving up one position overall to 6th best restaurant in the world. In 2012, Alinea came down one spot on the list. Per Se gained the 6th place, thus making Alinea the 2nd best restaurant in the U.S. and 7th overall.

In November 2009, Achatz and his Alinea team designed the menu for Ikarus, a restaurant in Salzburg, Austria which brings in a top chef from a different restaurant each month to design the menu for that month and train the staff.

Alinea was awarded three stars in the 2011 Michelin Guide for Chicago. It was repeated in 2012 when Alinea was the only restaurant to receive three stars in the 2012 Michelin Guide for Chicago.

Achatz's other restaurants include Next, a restaurant that uses a unique ticketing system in Chicago, and The Aviary, a bar. Roister Chicago, a casual West Loop concept helmed by Chef Andrew Brochu, The Office, a speakeasy cocktail bar located under The Aviary bar, and The Aviary/ Office NYC located in the Mandarin Oriental, New York.

Reservations for Achatz's restaurant, Next, are so sought after, that tickets could be found on Craigslist for up to $500 per person. In February 2012, Achatz held a Dutch auction for tickets to Next's elBulli-inspired menu, raising over $275,000 for charity in just two days. Auction prices ranged from $4,000 to $5,000 for parties of two.

Achatz has also served as a coach for the biennial culinary competition in Lyon, France, Bocuse d'Or.

In 2016 Achatz and partner Nick Kokonas closed Alinea for a complete renovation and overhaul of the food, space, and experience.

In 2016 Achatz and his team launched two consecutive multi-week pop-up experiences in Madrid, Spain, and Miami, Florida, over the course of Alinea's closure.

On May 27, 2016, Achatz appeared on season two of the Netflix series Chef's Table. In 2018, Achatz appeared as a judge on the Netflix series The Final Table.

Books
In October 2008, Grant Achatz and co-author Nick Kokonas published Alinea, a hardcover coffee table book featuring more than 100 of the restaurant's recipes. The book's narrative follows life in the kitchen for Achatz and his crew, and includes more than 400 behind-the-scenes photographs by Lara Kastner.

In June 2009, Achatz and Kokonas sold Life, On the Line, their dual-voiced recount of their collaboration on Alinea and Achatz's battle with cancer to Gotham Books. The book was released on March 3, 2011.

Kokonas and Achatz have also released two digital cookbooks from Next Restaurant, one on the Apple iBook platform, and one in a more universal PDF format. As in the style of the Alinea cookbook, both books provide the exact recipes used during the Paris 1906 and Tour of Thailand menus, without making adjustments for the average home cook. While the Paris 1906 book was released for purchase via iTunes, Tour of Thailand was released on a pay-what-you-want model on Next's ticketing site.

Grant was featured in a 2014 Dan Waldschmidt's book Edgy Conversations: How Ordinary People Can Achieve Outrageous Success, a book about preventing suicide with sense with stories about famous people that had disasters. Almost at the end of the book, he told the story about Grant's tongue cancer in July 2007 and the success of his restaurant in that time.

Health issues
On July 23, 2007, Achatz announced that he had been diagnosed with stage 4 squamous cell carcinoma of the mouth, which spread to his lymph nodes. Initially, Achatz was told that only radical surgery was indicated, which would remove part of his mandibular anatomy, including part of his tongue and large swaths of neck tissue. Later, University of Chicago physicians prescribed a course of chemotherapy and radiation treatments. This led to full remission, albeit with some side effects including a transitory loss of his sense of taste, which eventually returned. On December 18, 2007, Achatz announced that he was cancer-free. He credited an aggressive protocol of chemotherapy and radiation therapy administered at the University of Chicago Medical Center for driving his cancer into full remission. The treatment regimen, administered under the direction of Drs. Everett E. Vokes, Blair and Haraf at University of Chicago, did not require radical invasive surgery on Achatz' tongue.

Personal life
Achatz has two sons, Kaden and Keller, with ex-wife Angela Snell; 
the couple divorced in 2006.The  name "Keller" was chosen to honor Achatz's mentor Thomas Keller.

Awards
 Best New Chefs, Food & Wine, 2002
 Best Restaurant in America, Gormet, 2006
 40 Top Chicago Restaurants Ever, Chicago, #1, 2010
 AAA Five Diamond Award, AAA, 2007–2017
 Mobil Five Star Award, Mobil Travel Guide, 2007–2017
 Jean Banchet Award – Best Celebrity Chef, 2007
 Jean Banchet Award – Best Fine Dining, 2007
 The S. Pellegrino World's 50 Best Restaurants, #36, 2007
 The S. Pellegrino World's 50 Best Restaurants, Highest New Entry, 2007
 The S. Pellegrino World's 50 Best Restaurants, #21, 2008
 The S. Pellegrino World's 50 Best Restaurants, #10, 2009
 The S. Pellegrino World's 50 Best Restaurants, #7, 2010
 The S. Pellegrino World's 50 Best Restaurants, The Acqua Panna Best Restaurant In North America, 2010
 The S. Pellegrino World's 50 Best Restaurants, #6, 2011
 The S. Pellegrino World's 50 Best Restaurants, The Acqua Panna Best Restaurant In North America, 2011
 The S. Pellegrino World's 50 Best Restaurants, Chefs' Choice Award, 2013
 The S. Pellegrino World's 50 Best Restaurants, #9, 2014 
 The S. Pellegrino World's 50 Best Restaurants, #26, 2015 
 The S. Pellegrino World's 50 Best Restaurants, #15, 2016 
 The S. Pellegrino World's 50 Best Restaurants, #21, 2017
 The S. Pellegrino World's 50 Best Restaurants, #34, 2018
 The S. Pellegrino World's 50 Best Restaurants, #37, 2019 
 James Beard Foundation Award – Rising Star Chef of the Year, 2003 
 James Beard Foundation Award – Best Chef: Great Lakes, 2007
 James Beard Foundation Award – Outstanding Chef, 2008
 James Beard Foundation Award – Book Award: Cooking from a Professional Point of View, 2009
 James Beard Foundation Award – Outstanding Service Award, 2010, 2016
 James Beard Foundation Awards – Outstanding Restaurant, 2016
 Top Service Award (Chicago), Zagat Survey, 2006
 Zagat Guide "Excellent" Rating, 2008
 3 Michelin Stars, 2011
 3 Michelin Stars, 2013
 3 Michelin Stars, 2014
 3 Michelin Stars, 2015
 3 Michelin Stars, 2016
 3 Michelin Stars, 2017
 The 2011 Time 100
 Elite Traveler Top 100 Restaurants in the World - The list. #1, 2011
 Elite Traveler Top 100 Restaurants in the World - The list. #1, 2012
 Elite Traveler Top 100 Restaurants in the World - The list. #1, 2013
 Elite Traveler Top 100 Restaurants in the World - The list. #1, 2014
 Elite Traveler Top 100 Restaurants in the World - The list. #1, 2015 
 Elite Traveler Top 100 Restaurants in the World - The list. #1, 2016
 Elite Traveler Top 100 Restaurants in the World - The list. #2, 2017
 Elite Traveler Top 100 Restaurants in the World - The list. #1, 2018

References

External links

 Official website
 Early profile of Achatz
 Profile in Four magazine
 Wired magazine article
 Chef Triumphs Over Cancer and In the Culinary World — UChicago Medicine
 Men's Vogue article about Achatz's battle with cancer
 New Yorker article about Achatz's cancer fight
 Chicago magazine article about Achatz's cancer journey
 Cutting-Edge Food With Grant Achatz  - slideshow by Life
 youtube.com Grant Achatz creating Dessert of 20 Course Meal at Alinea

1974 births
Living people
Culinary Institute of America Hyde Park alumni
Chefs from Chicago
American male chefs
Chefs from Illinois
Molecular gastronomy
Head chefs of Michelin starred restaurants
People from St. Clair, Michigan
American restaurateurs
James Beard Foundation Award winners
Chefs from Michigan